First United Methodist Church is an historic Methodist church in downtown Albuquerque, New Mexico. The church was chartered in 1880 and the original building, constructed between 1880 and 1882, was the first church in New Town. By the turn of the century, the original sanctuary was found inadequate and was demolished. In 1904, a new sanctuary, now known as the Fellowship Hall, was built to replace this original adobe church on the same site.  The architect was Charles Frederick Whittlesey and Tiffany-style windows were installed some short time after the completion of the building.

By 1955, this sanctuary itself was outgrown and so a larger sanctuary was built on the property. The building was added to the New Mexico State Register of Cultural Properties in 1975 and the National Register of Historic Places in 1976.

References

External links

Methodist churches in New Mexico
Churches in Albuquerque, New Mexico
Churches completed in 1904
New Mexico State Register of Cultural Properties
Churches on the National Register of Historic Places in New Mexico
Gothic Revival church buildings in New Mexico
National Register of Historic Places in Albuquerque, New Mexico